Pornchai Thongburan (born July 1, 1974) is a boxer from Thailand who competed in the Light Middleweight (– 71 kg) at the 2000 Summer Olympics and won the bronze medal.

Olympic results 
1st round bye
Defeated Karoly Balzsay (Hungary) 17-12
Defeated Mohamed Hekal (Egypt) 15-9
Lost to Marian Simion (Romania) 16-26

References
 sports-reference

1974 births
Living people
Boxers at the 2000 Summer Olympics
Pornchai Thongburan
Pornchai Thongburan
Olympic medalists in boxing
Asian Games medalists in boxing
Boxers at the 1994 Asian Games
Pornchai Thongburan
Pornchai Thongburan
Medalists at the 2000 Summer Olympics
Pornchai Thongburan
Medalists at the 1994 Asian Games
Southeast Asian Games medalists in boxing
Pornchai Thongburan
Competitors at the 2001 Southeast Asian Games
Light-middleweight boxers